Qardho District is a district in the region  in Puntland, Somalia.  The district had previously been in the northeastern Bari region before this was split into two. Its capital lies at Qardho.

References

External links
 Districts of Somalia
 Administrative map of Qardho District

Districts of Somalia

Bari, Somalia